The 1949 NFL season was the 30th regular season of the National Football League. Prior to the season, Boston Yanks owner Ted Collins asked the league to fold his team due to financial woes, and give him a new one in New York City. This new team would be called the New York Bulldogs. The franchise, which has never missed a season in some form, carried on the legacy of the final Ohio League member Dayton Triangles, and its players and assets were moved to New York but not specifically folded. As a result of the move, professional football would not return to Boston until the Patriots began play in 1960.

As the regular season came to a close, a merger agreement between the NFL and the All-America Football Conference was announced on December 9. Three AAFC teams joined the NFL in 1950, the Cleveland Browns, San Francisco 49ers, and Baltimore Colts.

The season ended on December 18 with the NFL Championship Game. In muddy conditions, the visiting Philadelphia Eagles defeated the Los Angeles Rams 14–0, as heavy rain in southern California kept the attendance under 23,000 at the Los Angeles Memorial Coliseum. Both teams had potent offenses, but were severely limited by the poor field conditions. The management of the Eagles and Rams had favored a postponement for a week, but were overruled by commissioner Bert Bell.

Draft
The 1949 NFL Draft was held on December 21, 1948 at Philadelphia's Bellevue-Stratford Hotel. With the first pick, the Philadelphia Eagles selected center Chuck Bednarik from the University of Pennsylvania.

Major rule changes
The free substitution rule (any or all of the players may be replaced by substitutes after any play) was re-adopted for one year. The rule was previously adopted in 1943 in response to the depleted rosters during World War II, but repealed in 1946. 
Plastic helmets allowed again, after being outlawed in 1948.

Division races
In the Eastern Division, Philadelphia and Pittsburgh both had records of 4–1–0 when they met in Week Six.  The Eagles won 38–7, and kept the lead for the remainder of the season.  In the Western Division, the Rams got off to a 6–0–0 start while the Bears were 3–3–0 at midseason.  Though the Bears won all of their remaining games, they never caught up to the Rams, who finished at 8–2–2.

Had the current (post-1972) system of counting ties as half a win and half a loss been in place in 1949, the Rams would have required a playoff with the Bears for the Western Division.

Final standings

NFL Championship Game

Philadelphia 14, Los Angeles 0 at Los Angeles Memorial Coliseum, Los Angeles, December 18, 1949.

League leaders

Coaching changes
Chicago Cardinals: Jimmy Conzelman left the team. Phil Handler and Buddy Parker served as co-head coaches of the Cardinals for the first six games of 1949. Parker then was the sole head coach for the last six games.
New York Bulldogs: Charley Ewart was named as the first head coach of the new team.
Washington Redskins: Turk Edwards was replaced by John Whelchel. Whelchel was released after seven games, and Herman Ball then became the new Washington head coach.

Stadium changes
The New York Bulldogs began play at the Polo Grounds, sharing it with the Giants

References

 NFL Record and Fact Book
 NFL History 1941–1950 (Last accessed December 4, 2005)
 Total Football: The Official Encyclopedia of the National Football League

National Football League seasons